The Best and the Rest is a greatest hits album by the American heavy metal band Savatage, released on November 21, 1997 by JVC Victor in Japan. The majority of the tracks were selected as part of a reader's vote promotion in the Japanese hard rock magazine Burrn!.

The booklet for the album contains lyrics, Japanese translations of the lyrics, liner notes by Savatage producer/songwriter Paul O'Neill, a band biography, and a Savatage discography.

Track listing

Track notes
"Voyage" is a solo instrumental composition written and performed acoustically by guitarist Al Pitrelli. It was recorded during studio sessions for The Wake of Magellan (1997).
"Desirée" is an acoustic track with a piano and Zachary Stevens on vocals. Originally written for the Streets album, it was cut when the record was trimmed to a single disc format. This version was recorded in the summer of 1997, it is also featured on several reissues.
"All That I Bleed" is a previously unreleased acoustic track that is performed by Jon Oliva singing and playing piano. This version was recorded in the summer of 1997, it is also featured as the bonus track on several reissues. The original was released on Edge of Thorns in 1993 with Zak Stevens on vocals.

Savatage albums
Victor Entertainment compilation albums
1997 compilation albums
Albums produced by Paul O'Neill (rock producer)